Corrhenes is a genus of longhorn beetles of the subfamily Lamiinae, containing the following species:

subgenus Corrhenes
 Corrhenes crassicollis (Pascoe, 1864)
 Corrhenes elongata Breuning, 1938
 Corrhenes flavovittata Breuning, 1938
 Corrhenes funebris Breuning, 1938
 Corrhenes glauerti McKeown, 1942
 Corrhenes guttulata Pascoe, 1865
 Corrhenes macmillani Gilmour, 1950
 Corrhenes mystica (Pascoe, 1863)
 Corrhenes papuana Breuning, 1959
 Corrhenes paulla (Germar, 1848)
 Corrhenes sectator (Pascoe, 1865)
 Corrhenes stigmatica (Pascoe, 1863)
 Corrhenes undulata Breuning, 1938

subgenus Fulvocorrhenes
 Corrhenes fulva Pascoe, 1875
 Corrhenes funesta (Pascoe, 1869)
 Corrhenes grisella Pascoe, 1875
 Corrhenes nigrithorax McKeown, 1942

subgenus Setocorrhenes
 Corrhenes mastersi Blackburn, 1897
 Corrhenes scenica (Pascoe, 1863)

References

 
Pteropliini